Brechin is a town and former Royal burgh in Angus, Scotland. Traditionally Brechin was described as a city because of its cathedral and its status as the seat of a pre-Reformation Roman Catholic diocese (which continues today as an episcopal seat of the Scottish Episcopal Church), but that status has not been officially recognised in the modern era. 

Nevertheless, the designation is often used, with examples being the City of Brechin and District Community Council, City of Brechin and Area Partnership, City of Brechin Civic Trust and Brechin City Football Club. Kinnaird Castle is nearby. Brechin is located slightly closer to Dundee than Aberdeen and is located on the A90 between the cities. It is the fourth largest settlement of Angus.

History

In the centre of Brechin is a small museum in the Brechin Town House, and an award-winning tourist attraction, the Caledonian Railway. Along with the cathedral and round tower, part of the chapel of Brechin's Maison Dieu or hospital survives from the Middle Ages; the Maison Dieu was founded before 1267 by William de Brechin. The Maison Dieu chapel is in the care of Historic Environment Scotland. The Bank Street drill hall was completed in 1879.

The Guildry Incorporation of Brechin was formed in 1629 by merchants and traders in the Burgh and in 1666 obtained recognition of its rights under Decree of the Convention of Burghs. The Guildry's historic purposes have been assumed by local government and its current functions are social and civic.

Religion

Brechin Cathedral

The town is well known for its cathedral, with eleventh century round tower (Historic Environment Scotland), one of only two of these Irish-style monuments surviving in Scotland (the other is at Abernethy, Perthshire). The tower was originally free-standing, but is now incorporated in the framework of the cathedral.

The cathedral has been much altered, but still contains medieval work of the 13th and 14th centuries, notably a handsome western tower and processional door.

Scottish Episcopal Church
In 1695, following the Glorious Revolution, the town's Episcopalians were driven out of Brechin Cathedral which remained under the control of the Church of Scotland. A meeting house was set up in the High Street with a chapel being built in 1743. Following the Jacobite rising of 1745, the chapel's seats and books were destroyed by government forces and the chapel was taken over by a qualified congregation. 

A new Episcopalian Church, St Andrews Church was built in 1809 and consecrated in June 1811. This was replaced by a new building in 1888. St Andrews Church is part of the Diocese of Brechin and its archives are held by the University of Dundee.

Governance
Brechin is represented within Angus Council by the Brechin & Edzell ward, from which three councillors are elected.

Education
Education in Brechin is managed by the Education Department of Angus Council. There is one secondary school in the area; Brechin High School and four feeder primary schools; Andover Primary school, Edzell Primary School, Maisondieu Primary School and Stracathro Primary School.

Public services 
Brechin Infirmary was designed by local architect William Fettis (or Fettes) and opened in 1869 by Fox Maule-Ramsay, 11th Earl of Dalhousie. On opening, the hospital had beds for up to 30 patients. Four new wards were added in a major extension built circa 1929 and further expansion took place in 1960 when new out-patients and physiotherapy departments were included within a separate new single-story building. The infirmary closed in 2015 and looks set to be demolished. A parochial lodging house for paupers (a poor house) was opened in grounds next to the infirmary in 1880. It had accommodation for eighty persons in eleven wards. Renamed St Drostan's House, it was later used by Angus Council as a care home for the elderly.

Sport
Brechin City F.C. contest in the Highland Football League at its stadium Glebe Park. Glebe Park is the only senior football ground in Europe which has a hedge along one of its perimeters. Brechin is also home to the junior football club Brechin Victoria who play at Victoria Park.

Brechin Golf Club was formed in 1893, at Trinity Muir with a 9 hole course.  Records show that by 1924 an agreement had been made to purchase Limefield Farm.  In 1926 the famous James Braid was invited to play the course. Braid was so impressed he suggested suitable sites for sand bunkers in the Limefield section of the course. The course was expanded to the current layout to mark its centenary year in June 1993.

Transportation 
Brechin was previously served by Brechin railway station, a terminus of several lines. It was closed to passengers in 1952, but has since reopened as part of the Caledonian Railway heritage railway. The single-carriageway bypass of Brechin was dualled and reopened in March 1994, completing the dualling of the newly numbered A90 between Perth and Aberdeen.

Notable people
 Dame Anne Begg, former Member of Parliament for Aberdeen South.
 Sir David de Brechin (d. 1320), Lord of Brechin.
 Joseph Fairweather Lamb, academic and former Chandos Chair of Physiology at the University of St Andrews.
 James McCosh Church of Scotland and Free Church minister at Brechin. Later president of Princeton University
 David Myles, former MP for Banffshire and public servant.
 Robin Orr, composer.
 Robert Watson-Watt, radar pioneer, born in Brechin.

Gallery

See also
Battle of Brechin
List of places in Angus
Brechin Castle, seat of the Earls of Dalhousie since the late 20th century

References

External links

 Brechin Online Local Community Website for Brechin.
 Brechin Advertiser - local newspaper
 Brechin Town House Museum
 Brechin Environment 

 
Towns in Angus, Scotland